Room Service is Shaun Cassidy's fourth studio album.

Cassidy and songwriter-producer Michael Lloyd recruited 13 different musicians for the production of Room Service. The credits include four different guitarists and seven different keyboardists.

The album's only single, "You're Usin' Me," failed to chart.

Track listing

Track listing

References

Shaun Cassidy albums
1979 albums
Warner Records albums
Albums produced by Michael Lloyd (music producer)